Víctor Manuel Marte (born November 8, 1980) is a Dominican former Major League Baseball pitcher. Marte bats and throws right-handed.

He was the 500th Dominican Republic player to debut in Major League Baseball.

Career
Marte pitched for the Hiroshima Toyo Carp of Nippon Professional Baseball before signing with the Royals.

Marte was designated for assignment by the St. Louis Cardinals on October 3, 2013.

Marte throws four pitches — a four-seam fastball in the mid 90s with good tailside break, a slider in the low-to-mid 80s, a splitter in the low 80s, and a changeup in the mid-to-high 80s. The curve is used more against right-handed hitters, and the changeup is used more against left-handers.

References

External links

1980 births
Living people
Acereros de Monclova players
Dominican Republic expatriate baseball players in Japan
Dominican Republic expatriate baseball players in Mexico
Dominican Republic expatriate baseball players in the United States
Erie SeaWolves players
Hiroshima Toyo Carp players
Kansas City Royals players

Major League Baseball pitchers
Major League Baseball players from the Dominican Republic
Memphis Redbirds players
Mexican League baseball pitchers
Navegantes del Magallanes players
Nippon Professional Baseball pitchers
Northwest Arkansas Naturals players
Omaha Royals players
Rojos del Águila de Veracruz players
St. Louis Cardinals players
Tigres de Quintana Roo players
Tigres del Licey players
Dominican Republic expatriate baseball players in Venezuela